Pagasarri (Basque language name meaning 'thick forest of beech') is one of the two small mountain ranges that encloses the city of Bilbao, Basque Country, Spain and is part of the Basque Mountains. Its main peak separates the municipality of Bilbao from Arrigorriaga and Alonsotegi, and has an elevation of 673 m. It is part of a wider massif called Ganekogorta.

The refuge close to the summit is a popular destination for weekend trekkers that climb Pagasarri directly from the city streets.

External links
 (es) Pagasarri at wikineos (includes maps and many photos)
 (es) Camino del Pagasarri 

Geography of Bilbao
Tourist attractions in Bilbao
Mountain ranges of the Basque Country (autonomous community)